"I Wish You Would" is a hip hop song by American musician DJ Khaled, released as the second single from his sixth studio album, Kiss the Ring. The song features American rappers Kanye West and Rick Ross, and production from Hit-Boy. The song premiered on Hot 97 with Funkmaster Flex. It was later released for digital download in the United States on June 27, 2012.

Music video
On July 16, 2012, DJ Khaled published images from the sets of the video, via his Twitter account. Mack Maine, Ace Hood, and Birdman make cameos. The video was directed by Hype Williams, who already worked on the music video for "Go Hard", with Khaled and West. The video was recorded in the same place of West's single, "Cold". On August 6, 2012, the behind-the-scenes video was released showing footage from the sets of it, featuring the guest artists. The video premiered on BET's 106 & Park on August 13, 2012, along with the music video for West's single "Cold".

Track listing
Digital single

Charts

Release history

References

External links
 

2012 singles
2012 songs
DJ Khaled songs
Kanye West songs
Rick Ross songs
Songs written by Kanye West
Cash Money Records singles
Music videos directed by Hype Williams
Songs written by Rick Ross
Song recordings produced by Hit-Boy
Songs written by Hit-Boy
Songs written by DJ Khaled